Seyyed Baqer may refer to:
 Seyyed Baqer, Kermanshah
 Seyyed Baqer, Khuzestan